The Fluminense Federal University (Portuguese: Universidade Federal Fluminense, UFF, named after the state's demonym) is a public higher education institution located mainly in Niterói and in other cities of Rio de Janeiro state. It was first established on December 18, 1960, with the name of Universidade Federal do Estado do Rio de Janeiro (UFERJ), through an integration of different academic colleges in the city of Niterói. On November 5, 1965, the current name became official.

It is considered one of the main centers of excellence in Brazil, ranked in the 17th (out of 68) national position in the Center for World University Rankings of the best universities  and 889th (out of 1000) world position. UFF is among the top 25 universities in Latin America, according to research published by the Webometrics Ranking of World Universities. Besides, UFF has become the sixteenth largest university in the country, the sixth largest public university and the third largest federal university in the country.

History 

UFF was established in 1960, with the name Universidade Federal do Estado do Rio de Janeiro (UFERJ). The university began with the merger of five existing federal institutions in Niterói, three state institutions and two private colleges, becoming a part of the federal government and being renamed Universidade Federal Fluminense (Federal Fluminense University).

After a rough start, with a power struggle due to the institutions’ different administrations, the military government ruling at that time imposed a model structure for the university to its units and departments. Following the country's tradition in other institutions at the time, the main aim of the university was academic training, focusing on resources to qualify citizens for professional development. Research had a more formal role, and extension programs had different functions, with the main aim to offer services to the community. Today, these remain the three pillars of the university.

In the 1990s, UFF expanded and began to offer new programs in campuses in different towns in regional areas if Rio de Janeiro state. From these programs, new departments and colleges were established. In the 2000s, these regional units were known as University Centers (Pólos Universitários da UFF).

The University

Location (campuses) 
Its headquarters and the major number of UFF unities are located in the city of Niterói. Besides Niterói, the university has academic unities in other cities inside the Rio de Janeiro state, being the Federal University present in the highest number of municipalities in the country.

UFF is also part of the CEDERJ Consortium, which teaches distance learning undergraduation courses through centers located in the Rio de Janeiro state.

In the city of Niterói (its headquarters) 
There are three big campuses in the city: Gragoatá Campus, Praia Vermelha Campus and Valonguinho Campus, beyond other locations at the same city.

 Gragoatá Campus hosts the History, Anthropology, Social Sciences, Public Policies, Philosophy, Sociology, Psychology, Pedagogy, Letters (German, Spanish, French, Greek, English, Italian, Latin and Portuguese/Literatures), Social Service, Economics, Mathematics, Statistics, Hotel Management, Public Administration, Social Service, International Relations, Tourism and Physical Education courses. The Gragoatá Campus has contributed to a change in the neighbourhood where it is located, once strictly residential, to an area that has restaurants, bookstores and cultural areas.
 Praia Vermelha Campus hosts all the Engineering courses of the university (Chemical, Civil Engineering, Electrical, Environmental and Agricultural, Environmental and Water Resources, Mechanical, Petroleum, Production and Telecommunications) and the courses of Architecture and Urbanism, Industrial Design, Public Safety, Computational Mathematics, Computational Physics, Computer Systems, Computing Sciences, Environmental Sciences, Geophysics and Physics.
 Valonguinho Campus is the closest to the ferryboat station that goes to Rio de Janeiro city and hosts the courses of biological sciences, chemistry, industrial chemistry, dentistry, nutrition, business administration, accounting sciences, management processes, speech therapy and veterinary medicine.

Some schools and institutes are located outside campuses, such as the

 Institute of Art and Social Communication: advertising and propaganda, arts, archival science, cinema and audiovisual studies, cultural production, journalism, library science and documentation and media studies.
 Law School;
 Medical School: Medicine and Pharmacy;
 Nursing School;
 Biomedical Institute;
 Veterinary School; and
 Aurora de Afonso Costa Pharmacy School.

Along with teaching facilities, UFF is also in charge for the Antônio Pedro University Hospital, Veterinary Hospital, Geraldo Reis University School (Elementary and High School), UFF Arts Center (a cultural complex with art and photographies galleries, cinema, theater, string quartet and choirs and symphonic orchestra), University Pharmacy, Accessibility and Inclusion Office, University Restaurant (low-cost meals for all the students), Shuttle bus (free campus-to-campus transportation) and Kindergarten School.

In other cities 
 Campos dos Goytacazes: Economics, Social Sciences, Geography, History, Psychology and Social Service;
 Petrópolis: Production Engineering;
 Angra dos Reis: Public Policies, Geography and Pedagogy;
 Nova Friburgo: Biomedicine, Dentistry and Speech Therapy;
 Rio das Ostras: Computing Sciences, Nursing, Production Engineering, Cultural Production, Psychology and Social Service; 
 Volta Redonda: Engineering (Agribusiness, Metallurgical, Mechanical and Production), Business Administration, Public Administration, Accounting Sciences, Law, Psychology, Computational Physics, Mathematics and Chemistry;
 Santo Antônio de Pádua: Natural Sciences, Computing Sciences, Physics, Interdisciplinary Education in the Field, Mathematics and Pedagogy;
 Advanced Unity in Oriximiná, Pará;
 University Farm in Cachoeiras de Macacu;
 Quissamã: Tourism;
 Macaé: Business Administration, Accounting Sciences and Law;
 Itaperuna: Business Administration;
 Miracema: Accounting Sciences.

UFF in numbers 

Source:

References

External links 

 
 Center for World University Rankings
 Information about UFF Undergraduation Courses 
 Information about UFF Graduation Courses 
 Information about UFF Outreach Activities 
 UFF in Numbers 
 UFF International Cooperation Office 
 UFF Arts Center 
 UFF Publishing House 

Educational institutions established in 1960
Universities and colleges in Rio de Janeiro (state)
1960 establishments in Brazil
 
Federal universities of Brazil